Steve Simms is an Australian former professional rugby league footballer, rugby league coach, rugby league administrator and rugby league commentator. He coached in the 1990s and 2000s, and was an administrator in the 2000s and 2010s. 

He coached Leigh, Halifax Blue Sox, Featherstone Rovers and the Salford City Reds.

He was also a co-commentator for the BBC in their coverage of the Challenge Cup.

References

External links
Steve Sims April 1997 to September 1998.
Rugby League: Simms to continue at Leigh
DVD LIST
Search for "Steve Simms" at britishnewspaperarchive.co.uk
Search for ""Steve Simms"" at loverugbyleague.com

Living people
Australian rugby league administrators
Australian rugby league coaches
Australian rugby league commentators
Australian rugby league players
BBC sports presenters and reporters
Featherstone Rovers coaches
Halifax R.L.F.C. coaches
Leigh Leopards coaches
Rugby league players from Sydney
Salford Red Devils coaches
Year of birth missing (living people)
Rugby articles needing expert attention